Labeo roseopunctatus is a species of fish in the genus Labeo which occurs in the upper reaches of the Senegal and Niger rivers in Guinea and Mali.

References 

Labeo
Fish described in 1990